Benoistia is a genus of shrubs or trees of the spurge family (Euphorbiaceae) and the monotypic subtribe Benoistiinae. It was first described as a genus in 1939. The entire genus is endemic to Madagascar. It is dioecious.

Species
 Benoistia orientalis Radcl.-Sm. - N + E Madagascar
 Benoistia perrieri H.Perrier & Leandri - Madagascar
 Benoistia sambiranensis H.Perrier & Leandri - N Madagascar

References

Aleuritideae
Euphorbiaceae genera
Endemic flora of Madagascar
Dioecious plants
Taxa named by Joseph Marie Henry Alfred Perrier de la Bâthie
Taxa named by Jacques Désiré Leandri